Jacob Burns (Russian Empire, 1902 - 1993, New York City) was a prominent New York attorney specializing in corporate law and estates and trusts. He was a philanthropist, a painter, and a corporate leader. He was a founder and, for several years, chairman of the board of U.S. Vitamin and Pharmaceutical Corp., a public company that merged with Revlon in 1966. Mr. Burns was a member of the Revlon board of directors from 1966 to 1985.

Jacob Burns’ father, George Burns (born Zorak Bialack) immigrated to the United States from Kyiv, Ukraine.  He settled in Washington, D.C., around 1915, where he opened what may have been that city's first silent movie house on 14th St. NW.  As a teen, it was Jacob Burns’ job to deliver the film to the theater on his bicycle, and to work the pedals of the player piano throughout the show.

At Yeshiva University, Mr. Burns served on the board of trustees and was a founding director of the Sy Syms School of Business. He was a member of the Cardozo Board of Directors from 1976 until his death in 1993 and was chairman from 1986 to 1992. In 1984, Yeshiva conferred upon him the honorary degree of Doctor of Humane Letters. In 1970, Mr. Burns received an honorary Doctor of Laws degree from the George Washington University Law School, from which he had graduated in 1924. He was a member of the Order of the Coif for more than six decades. At George Washington University, he was a trustee for many years and a member of the board of directors of the George Washington University Law Association, which presented him with its Distinguished Alumnus Award in 1975. He also received the Alumni Achievement Award in 1983 from the university's General Alumni Association. He was a member of the Alpha chapter of Phi Alpha at GW and a long-standing member of the Board of Directors of the national fraternity. In April, 1959, Phi Alpha fraternity merged with Phi Sigma Delta and in 1969–70, Phi Sigma Delta merged into Zeta Beta Tau. Mr. Burns served as a Director of the Zeta Beta Tau Foundation from December 18, 1970 - December 31, 1972.

In the legal field, he was vice chairman of the Committee on Character and Fitness of the Appellate Division of the Supreme Court of the State of New York, first Judicial Department. For many years, he was a director of the New York County Lawyers' Association, which awarded him its Medal for Conspicuous Service. He was chairman of the Joint Coordinating Committee on Discipline of the Association of the Bar of the City of New York and a member of the House of Delegates of the New York State Bar Association.

In addition to his involvement with Yeshiva University and the George Washington University, Mr. Burns was a philanthropic leader in a broad spectrum of institutions that promoted the advancement of learning and the arts, including the Metropolitan Opera Association, Thirteen (WNET), and Hillel: The Foundation for Jewish Campus Life. The Jacob Burns Foundation, which he founded in 1959, has given away millions of dollars to not-for-profit organizations in the U.S.  It continues his legacy today, providing grants to projects such as the Jacob Burns Film Center in Pleasantville, New York.

References 

1902 births
1993 deaths
New York (state) lawyers
George Washington University Law School alumni
Emigrants from the Russian Empire to the United States
20th-century American lawyers